Sara is a Flemish telenovela, based upon the Colombian telenovela Betty La Fea. It tells the story of Sara De Roose, a business economics graduate, who passed with honours at the university but has trouble finding a job—until she comes across an assistant job in a Belgian fashion company, called "Présence". The company is looking for a new general manager, and Sara's arrival coincides with the two CEOs arguing who this has to be.

The series was broadcast by the commercial station VTM, upon which it was shown every weekday at 6:25 pm. On Sundays, VTM broadcast all episodes of the past week, called 'De Week van Sara' ("Sara's week"). Sara premiered on 25 September 2007 and ended in June 2008, after 200 episodes. A new telenovela called LouisLouise (about a guy named Louis, who turns into a woman (Louise) by a spell) replaced Sara as of September 2008.

Sara begins the series as the "ugly duckling", mocked by many of her colleagues for being "ugly". As the series progresses, she develops confidence, moves up the ladder, becomes more powerful and explores romantic interests. The series also focuses on fellow Présence employees, and their relationships and career problems.

The show was written by a team of writers, led by Hugo Van Laere. He already wrote many scripts for Flemish TV series and movies, such as 16+, Rupel, and Dennis van Rita. The series was directed by Serge Bierset, Renaat Coppens, Filip Van Neyghem and Geoffrey Enthoven. The latter already directed many Flemish movies, such as The Only One and Happy Together.

Ratings
Sara's first episode was a huge success, with an average of 840,000 viewers (it was broadcast in prime time at 8:35 pm). The second episode was broadcast at its regular hour, 6:25 pm. This ensured a fall in viewers of 50%, with an average of 420,000 viewers. The reason is probably a game show, called Blokken, which is very popular in its time slot and starts at the same moment as Sara.

Slowly, the ratings of Sara increased. In December 2007, Sara already had an average of 450,000 to 550,000 viewers. As of February 2008, the ratings increased again, and Sara now has an average of 650,000 to 750,000 viewers. Since then Sara became a direct competitor for Blokken. And the success continued: ratings increased even more, and when VTM moved Sara to prime time again (for the last twenty episodes), ratings doubled and surpassed a million viewers. The final episode gathered more than 1.5mln viewers.

Cast

Main cast

Guest actors

Awards and nominations
On 13 February 2008, the nominees of the Flemish TV-stars (The Flemish Emmys) were announced. Sara was nominated for three awards. Veerle Baetens, who plays Sara, and Sandrine Andre, who plays Britt, were both nominated for Best Actor or Actress, but only Veerle Baetens won. The series was nominated for Best Fiction program, but didn't win. Katarakt, another Flemish TV series, won it. The 2 Public Awards, which were announced that night, were for Sara.

Trivia
 The US version of the show, Ugly Betty, was broadcast on VIJFtv, every Thursday evening. The show started almost 5 months after Sara premiered.
 Actress Veerle Baetens performed at Idool 2007 as Sara. Vera Mann, a rather famous musical performer who even worked with Baetens, was in the jury. Sara was not selected as she did not have the looks of an idol. Baetens was not recognized. The act was even broadcoasted during Idool and was also part during a dream Sara had in the series.

References

External links
 Official Site

2007 telenovelas
2008 telenovelas
2007 Belgian television series debuts
2008 Belgian television series endings
2007 Dutch television series debuts
2008 Dutch television series endings
Yo soy Betty, la fea
Television series by Fremantle (company)
Flemish television shows
Belgian drama television shows
VTM (TV channel) original programming